John Saunders Gilliat (24 November 1829 – 11 February 1912) was a British banker and Conservative politician.

He was the son of and Mary Anne Saunders of Fernill, Berkshire. His father was founder J K Gilliat and Company, a merchant banking company that traded in England and America. He was educated at Harrow School and University College, Oxford.

In 1860 he married Louisa Babington, daughter of Matthew Babington of Rothley and Frances Sykes, with whom he had six children. His daughter, Ida Sophia Gilliat, married George Vere Hugh Cholmondeley (b. 13 Sep 1871, d. 28 Mar 1925). In 1862 he joined the court of the Bank of England, and was Governor from 1883 to 1885, having previous served as its Deputy Governor. Gilliat's tenure as Governor occurred during the Panic of 1884.

In 1886, he was elected as Conservative Member of Parliament for the Clapham constituency of south London. In 1891 he put his name forward as Conservative candidate for the parliamentary seat of St Albans, but withdrew his candidacy. He was eventually chosen to contest Widnes when the sitting MP, T C Edwards-Moss retired for health reasons. He held the seat until 1900.

Gilliat made his home at Chorleywood, Hertfordshire. He was deeply involved in the affairs of the Church of England, and was a member of the Committee For Church Defence and Church Instruction and the Bishop of St Albans's Fund as well as being one of the governors of Queen Anne's Bounty.

On his death at the age of 82 in 1912 Gilliat was the oldest member of the Court of the Bank of England.

References

External links 
 

 
 
 
 

1829 births
1912 deaths
Alumni of University College, Oxford
Conservative Party (UK) MPs for English constituencies
Deputy Governors of the Bank of England
English bankers
Governors of the Bank of England
People educated at Harrow School
People from Chorleywood
UK MPs 1886–1892
UK MPs 1892–1895
UK MPs 1895–1900
19th-century English businesspeople